Farhat Seemi is a Pakistani politician who had been a Member of the Provincial Assembly of Sindh, from June 2013 to May 2018.

Early life and education
She was born on 11 September 1968 in Ratodero.

She has done Bachelor of Arts.

Political career

She was elected to the Provincial Assembly of Sindh as a candidate of Pakistan Peoples Party (PPP) on a reserved seat for women in 2013 Pakistani general election.

She was re-elected to the Provincial Assembly of Sindh as a candidate of PPP on a reserved seat for women in 2018 Pakistani general election.

References

Living people
Sindh MPAs 2013–2018
Women members of the Provincial Assembly of Sindh
1968 births
Pakistan People's Party MPAs (Sindh)
21st-century Pakistani women politicians